The Salawin National Park or Salween National Park() is located in Mae Sariang and Sop Moei Districts in Mae Hong Son Province, northern Thailand, adjacent to its border with Burma. Much of the Thai part of the Salween River is included in the  park.

The terrain includes the mountainous forested area of the Dawna Range and the rocky river. Populated areas within the park include the Karen village of Ta Tar Fan, and the riverside village of Mae Sam Laep.

Topography
Doi Khun Mae Kon is with  the highest peak in the park. This part of the Thanon Thong Chai Range is the origin to tributaries of the Salween, Yuam, Kong Kha, Mae Ngae and Han rivers.

Climate
The climate of Salween National park is as follows: Summer is from March to May, Rainy season is from June to October and Winter is from November to February.

History
In 1989 a survey was set up for Mae Yuam forest and Salween forest. The announcement of the establishment of the Salween National park has been approved in 1993. Later in 1994 Salween National Park with an area of 450,950 rai ~  was declared the 78th national park.

Flora
Thailand's second-largest teak tree is located in the park.  In 1997, an illegal logging scandal, involving forestry and military officials, was uncovered at the park. Almost a third of its trees, and that of the Salawin Wildlife Sanctuary, were logged between 1996 and 1998.

The park is home to the following forest types:
Deciduous forest include:

Dipterocarp forest include:

Fauna
Mammel sorts include:

Birds, of which species of passerines include:

Species of non-passerines include:

Butterflies species include:

See also
List of national parks of Thailand
List of Protected Areas Regional Offices of Thailand

References

National parks of Thailand
Geography of Mae Hong Son province
Tourist attractions in Mae Hong Son province
Protected areas established in 1994
1994 establishments in Thailand
Dawna Range